Aschau im Chiemgau is a municipality and a village in the district of Rosenheim in Bavaria in Germany.

Transport 

Aschau im Chiemgau station is on the Chiemgau Railway.

Personalities 

 Hans Clarin (1929-2005), actor and synchronist
 Location of Christian Wolff (born 1938), actor
Franz Halder, Chief of the General Staff of the German Army High Command, died here in 1972
 Peter Michael Hamel (born 1947), composer, founded the intercultural music institute in Aschau in 1998
 Effective place of Heinz Winkler (chef) (born 1949), cook
 Kurt Zeitzler, chief of the Army General Staff of the Wehrmacht, died here in 1963

Gallery

References

Rosenheim (district)
Villages in Bavaria